Neetu Lawrence David (born 1 September 1977) is an Indian former cricketer and current chairperson of the selection panel of the India women's cricket team. She played as a slow left-arm orthodox bowler. She appeared in 10 Test matches and 97 One Day Internationals for India between 1995 and 2008. She played domestic cricket for Uttar Pradesh and Railways.

David holds the record for the best bowling figures in a Women's Test innings, taking 8/53 against England in November 1995. She bowled with figures of 9/90 in the match which India ended up losing by two runs. These are the best bowling figures in a Women's Test match while ending up on the losing side. She is India's fourth-highest all-time wicket-taker in WTest cricket, and second-highest all-time wicket-taker for India in WODI cricket. She was also the first Indian bowler to 100 WODI wickets.

David announced her retirement from international cricket after the 2006 Rani Jhansi Trophy, with match winning figures of 3/19 for Railways against Air India in the final. But she reversed the decision in 2008, subsequently being picked in India's Asia Cup squad. She played her last international match on India's tour of England in 2008. She played her final domestic match in 2013, winning the final of the 2012–13 Senior Women's T20 League with Railways.

In September 2020, it was announced that David had been appointed as the chairperson of India's women's national selection panel.

References

External links

1977 births
Living people
Sportspeople from Kanpur
Indian women cricketers
India women Test cricketers
India women One Day International cricketers
Railways women cricketers
Uttar Pradesh women cricketers
Central Zone women cricketers
South Zone women cricketers